Deen Muhammad Khan (1900–1974) was a Bangladeshi Deobandi Islamic scholar and Mufassir. He was known for interpreting the Quran in Urdu. After completed his studies at Darul Uloom Deoband, he started teaching. He was one of the founders of Jamia Qurania Arabia Lalbagh. He taught for sometime in the Department of Islamic Studies at University of Dhaka and later at Government Madrasah-e-Alia. He was a politician of Jamiat Ulema-e-Islam Bangladesh.

Early life and education 
Deen Muhammad was born in January 1900 in Dhaka. His father Nurullah Khan was a captain in the British Army. His education began at the Chawkbazar Mosque in Dhaka. At that time Ibrahim Peshwari was in charge of religious education in Chawkbazar Mosque. He studied the primary textbooks of the Qawmi Madrasa to the secondary under Ibrahim Peshwari. He then went to Darul Uloom Deoband to pursue a higher degree in Hadith, Tafsir and Fiqh. Among his teachers was Anwar Shah Kashmiri. He also received a certificate of hadith from Kifayatullah Dehlawi.

Career 
For ten years from 1920 to 1930 he taught in various madrasas including Hammadia Madrasa in Dhaka. At that time, when Abdul Karim Madani came to preach Islam in Bangladesh, he met Madani. He used to translate Arabic discourses of various religious gatherings of Madani. Madani is fascinated by his proper translation and narrative style. So he took him on his way to Burma in 1930. There he was appointed Imam and Mufti of the Bangalo Munni Jame Mosque. He started lecturing on Tafsirul Quran in the mosque. Gradually he completed the Tafsir of the Qur'an in its entirety. When World War II broke out in 1941, he taught in the Department of Islamic Studies at Dhaka University and later at Government Madrasah-e-Alia. He was one of the founders of Jamia Qurania Arabia Lalbagh. After its establishment, he became its nazem ala. He also contributed to Islamic politics. He was imprisoned in Assam for some time for his active participation in the Khilafat Movement. He also played a significant role in the Pakistan movement. He was a politician of Jamiat Ulema-e-Islam Bangladesh. His name is mentioned as the forerunner of the formation of Siratunnabi Committee in Dhaka. He held a huge rally on the Racecourse Ground. He was a regular presenter on a radio program in the former East Pakistan entitled "The Qur'an and Our Lives". He has published two books. One is related to Tafseer of Surah Yusuf, the other is related to Dowa, Darood and Tasawwuf.

Death 
He died on December 2, 1974. The next day his janaza was held at Lalbagh Kella Maidan. There were millions of people at his funeral. He was buried at Lalbagh Shahi Mosque graveyard.

References 

20th-century Muslim scholars of Islam
Hanafi fiqh scholars
Deobandis
1900 births
1974 deaths
People from Dhaka District
20th-century Bengalis
Bangladeshi Sunni Muslim scholars of Islam
Bangladeshi people of Arab descent
Darul Uloom Deoband alumni
Jamiat Ulema-e-Islam Bangladesh politicians